Narromine Shire is a local government area in the Orana region of New South Wales, Australia. The Shire is located adjacent to the Mitchell Highway and the Main Western railway line. It was formed on 1 January 1981 from the amalgamation of the Municipality of Narromine and Timbrebongie Shire resulting from the Local Government Areas Amalgamation Act 1980.

Narromine Shire includes the towns of Narromine, Trangie and Tomingley.

The mayor of Narromine Shire Council is Cr. Craig Davies, an independent politician.

Demographics

Council

Current composition and election method
Narromine Shire Council is composed of nine councillors elected proportionally as a single ward. All councillors are elected for a fixed four-year term of office. The mayor is elected by the councillors at the first meeting of the council. The most recent election was held on 10 September 2016, and the makeup of the council is as follows:

The current Council, elected in 2016, in order of election, is:

References

Local government areas of New South Wales
1981 establishments in Australia